Urine sodium is a measurement of the concentration of sodium in the urine.

The urine sodium is expressed as a concentration (such as millimoles per liter).  The result must therefore be interpreted in the context of the degree of urine concentration present.  Alternatively, the urine sodium can be standardized to the excretion of creatinine using a formula such as the fractional excretion of sodium (FENa).  

Because the hypothalamus/osmoreceptor system ordinarily works well to cause drinking or urination to restore the body's sodium concentrations to normal, this system can be used in medical treatment to regulate the body's total fluid content, by first controlling the body's sodium content. Thus, when a powerful diuretic drug is given which causes the kidneys to excrete sodium, the effect is accompanied by an excretion of body water (water loss accompanies sodium loss). This happens because the kidney is unable to efficiently retain water while excreting large amounts of sodium. In addition, after sodium excretion, the osmoreceptor system may sense lowered sodium concentration in the blood and then direct compensatory urinary water loss in order to correct the hyponatremic (low blood sodium) state.

References

Renal physiology